The United States ambassador to Qatar is the official representative of the government of the United States to the government of Qatar.

Ambassadors

See also
Qatar – United States relations
Foreign relations of Qatar
Ambassadors of the United States

References

United States Department of State: Background notes on Qatar

External links
 United States Department of State: Chiefs of Mission for Qatar
 United States Department of State: Qatar
 United States Embassy in Doha

 
Qatar
United States